Rattlesnake Mountain is a summit in the U.S. state of Nevada.

Rattlesnake Mountain was so named on account of rattlesnakes near the summit.

References

Mountains of Elko County, Nevada